Ferdinand Leffler (December 12, 1978, Kadaň) is a Czech garden and landscape designer and the founder of Flera landscape architecture studio. His projects have won many awards and can be found all over the world. In addition to garden design, he promotes garden architecture. He was a host and a co-author of the TV show Ferdinand's Gardens on Czech Television channel, he has published books Green Rooms and Live in Your Garden, he regularly creates video content on Flera TV YouTube channel, organizes seminars as a part of Flera Academy project and in spring 2021 he launched online course “Live in Your Garden” in which he teaches how to plan a garden.

Career 
He graduated in Landscape Planning and Garden Engineering from the Czech University of Life Sciences. In 2009, he founded Flera landscape studio, in which he collaborates with more than 30 landscape architects. Together they form projects in the private and public space in the largest landscape architecture studio in Central Europe. You can also find his work overseas – in Canada, Costa Rica and Zanzibar in Africa. Many of his projects have won numerous awards, such as Garden of the Year and TOP Destination in the Czech Republic 2017.

In 2017, he acted as co-author and host on the Czech Television TV show “Ferdinand's Gardens”. The TV show ran for two series with a total of 16 episodes. The individual episodes deal with different types of gardens, from a small urban garden to a large rural one. The TV show received positive audience feedback and was the impetus for the creation of the Flera TV YouTube channel.  More than 40 educational and inspirational videos have been made there since the launch of the channel.

Projects

Czechia 
 Mitrowitz Castle, Koloděje nad Lužnicí (2015) - authors: Ferdinand Leffler, Anna Chomjaková 
 Castle Park in Žďár nad Sázavou (2015-2017) - authors: Ferdinand Leffler, Martina Imramovská, Jana Pyšková in collaboration with Flera studio
 Vila Na Petřinách, Prague 6 (2016) - authors: Ferdinand Leffler, Martina Imramovská, Markéta Hadačová in cooperation with Flera studio - Real Estate Project of the Year 2020 Award - Best of Realty 2020 
 Barrandovská zahrada (2016) - authors: Ferdinand Leffler, Martina Sarvašová, Markéta Šindlarová, Lukáš Rábek, Kasia Dorda in collaboration with Flera studio 
 Project Sakura, Prague (2017) - authors: Ferdinand Leffler, Markéta Šindlarová, Kasia Dorda and Martina Imramovská in collaboration with Flera studio 
 Troja Chateau (2017) - authors: Ferdinand Leffler, Tomáš Sklenář, Jitka Ulwerová, Kasia Dorda in collaboration with Flera studio 
 Pentagon Park for Škoda Auto, Mladá Boleslav (2018) - authors: Ferdinand Leffler and Lenka Kožíšková in cooperation with  Flera studio
 Urban conception of the city of Harrachov (2018) authors: Ferdinand Leffler, Helena Lišková, Jitka Ulwerová in cooperation with Flera studio 
 Zahálka Modřany, Riverpark Modřany (2018-2021) - authors: Ferdinand Leffler, Tomáš Sklenář, Lenka Kožíšková in collaboration with Flera studio 
 The winning design for the renewal of the Žižkovo náměstí park (2018-2021) - authors: Ferdinand Leffler, Tomáš Sklenář, Lenka Kožíšková, Katarína Gloneková in cooperation with Flera studio

Other countries 
 Hotel complex Zuri, Zanzibar (2014-2017) - authors: Ferdinand Leffler and Jana Pyšková in collaboration with Flera studio 
 Art Villa, Costa Rica (2017) - authors: Ferdinand Leffler and Anna Chomjaková in collaboration with Flera studio 
 Private Garden in Canada (2016) - authors: Ferdinand Leffler, Anna Chomjaková and Lukáš Rábek in collaboration with Flera studio
 Resort Veerhoeve, The Netherlands (2018) - authors: Ferdinand Leffler and Lenka Kožíšková in collaboration with Flera studio

Books 
Together with Tereza Frcalová, he wrote the book Live in Your Garden (2017), which describes a modern approach to garden planning. Two years later, the book Green Rooms (2019) followed, in which they compared individual parts of the garden in terms of their functions to the rooms in the house.

Awards 

 Garden of the Year 2014
 Garden of the Year 2014; 1st place: Roof private garden in Prague - Holešovice
 Garden of the Year 2016; 2nd place: Private Garden with Player, Olomouc
 Garden of the Year 2017; 3rd place: Garden of three tasks, Říčany
 Garden of the year 2022, 3rd place, Private family garden at Stará Lípa 
 Public anonymous landscape - architectural competition Renovation of Janko Kráľ Park in Trnava; 3rd place; 2017 
 TOP Destinations in the Czech Republic 2017, category Phoenix, private investor, Chateau Mitrowicz 
 Sakura, REALISM development group, nominated for the final shortlist of the WAN Awards 2017, in the Future Projects Residential category. Nomination for the final shortlist of the World Architecture Festival, category Residential - Future Projects
 Inhabited garden, private investor, Swimming pool of 2019, category Bio-pool 
 Garden full of joy, private investor, Swimming pool of 2019, category Other
 Barrandovská zahrada, Small-scale residential projects - 1st place, developer: T. E group, competition: Best of Realty 2019 
 Vila Na Petřinách, The best project in the Czech Republic, absolute winner, developer: All New Development, competition: Best of Realty 2020

Work style 
While studying at university, he spent a year in the US, traveling and pursuing various professions. He attended several lectures on architecture in Boston and worked in garden-architectural studios in California. Thanks to this experience, he began to perceive gardens more freely than according to the traditional European approach. American garden architecture does not have such a connection to history and can afford more experiments with space and material. Freedom in the creation of American gardens allows him to create natural projects without reference to the convulsive shapes of historic gardens.

He is interested in the needs of the people who will live in the garden before the actual designing itself. He does not create gardens that are just meant to be admired by people passing by, but gardens that pull their owners out of their house and make them enjoy the environment of the garden just as that of the living room. Gardens must entertain their owner. He considers understanding space very important. This allows him to work with the garden in such a way as to fulfill its potential.

Gallery

References

External links 

 Official website

1978 births
Living people
Czech architects
Landscape architects